The 2021–22 Toledo Rockets men's basketball team represented the University of Toledo during the 2021–22 NCAA Division I men's basketball season. The Rockets, led by 12th-year head coach Tod Kowalczyk, played their home games at Savage Arena, as members of the Mid-American Conference. They finished the season 26-8, 17-3 in MAC Play to finish as regular season champions. They defeated Central Michigan in the quarterfinals of the MAC tournament before losing in the semifinals to Akron.  As a No. 1 seed who failed to win their conference tournament, they received an automatic bid to the National Invitation Tournament where they lost in the first round to Dayton.

Previous season
In a season limited due to the ongoing COVID-19 pandemic, the Rockets finished the 2020–21 season 21–9, 15–4 in MAC play to win MAC regular season championship. They defeated Ball State in the first round of the MAC tournament before losing to eventual tournament champions Ohio in the second round. They received an at-large bid to the National Invitation Tournament where they lost to Richmond in the first round.

Offseason

Departures

Incoming transfers

2021 recruiting class

Roster

Schedule and results

|-
!colspan=9 style=|Exhibition

|-
!colspan=9 style=|Non-conference regular season

|-
!colspan=12 style=| MAC regular season

|-
!colspan=9 style=| MAC Tournament

|-

|-
!colspan=9 style=| <span
style=
>NIT</span> 

Source

References

Toledo
Toledo Rockets men's basketball seasons
Toledo Rockets men's basketball
Toledo Rockets men's basketball
Toledo